Millettia is a genus of legume in the family Fabaceae. It consists of about 150 species, which are distributed in the tropical and subtropical regions of the world. The genus was formerly known by the name Pongamia, but that name was rejected in favor of the name Millettia, and many species have been reclassified. Due to recent interest in biofuels, Pongamia is often the generic name used when referring to Millettia pinnata, a tree being explored for producing biodiesel.

Description 
In 1834, in Prodromus Florae Peninsulae Indiae Orientalis Robert Wight and George Arnott Walker-Arnott describe Millettia as:

Calyx cup-shaped, lobed or slightly toothed. Corolla papilionaceous: vexillum recurved, broad, emarginate, glabrous or silky on the back. Stamens diadelphous (9 and 1), the tenth quite distinct. Legume flat, elliptic or lanceolate, pointed, coriaceous, thick margined, wingless indehiscent, 1-2 seeded: valves closely cohering with each other all round the seeds and between them. Twining or arboreous. Leaves very large, unequally pinnated: leaflets opposite, with a setaceous partial stipule at the base of each partial petiole. Racemes axillary, more or less branched and compound. Flowers pretty large, purplish, pedicelled on shortish diverging partial peduncles.

Etymology 
Long known to residents of the Indies, China, and Africa, this species has had many traditional names. One of the oldest references in traditional Chinese medicine is in Bencao Gangmu Shiyi ("Supplement to Compendium of Materia Medica") where is called jixueteng. The Chinese name literally translates to "stem of chicken's blood" which refers to the red resin present in the stems of several climbing legume shrubs.

In the 1820s-1830s Charles Millett, a plant collector and an official with the East India Company, collected many samples of Millettia while living in Canton and Macao. He sent them to the University of Glasgow's Botanical Garden. In 1834, Robert Wight and George Arnott Walker-Arnott, both Scottish botanists, published Prodromus Florae Peninsulae Indiae Orientalis where the genus Millettia is first mentioned. The authors named the genus after Charles Millett, incorrectly referring to him as Dr. Charles Millett. Charles Millett of the East India Company has often been confused with Charles Millet, a French ichthyologist, who was active around the same time. In addition J. A. Millet, a French botanist from the 18th century, is often misattributed as the source.

Robert Sweet states that the genus Pongamia comes from the Malabar region in India and is derived from the local word Pongam (most likely from the Malayalam language). Pongamia had often been misattributed to Vent. (1803), but it was preceded by "Pongam Adans. (1763)", "Galedupa Lam. (1788)", and "Pungamia Lam. (1796)" and in accordance with the 1994 Tokyo Code of the International Code of Botanical Nomenclature, the correct citation was established as "Pongamia Adans. (1763)". In 1981 a proposal to conserve the genus Millettia and reject the genus Pongamia was proposed in the journal Taxon and was ratified in 1988.

Uses 
The species Millettia pinnata has been investigated for use as biofuel.

Species formerly in the genus 
Pongamia ovalifolia is a synonym for Millettia peguensis
Pongamia uliginosa is a synonym for Derris trifoliata

Species 

Selected species include:

 Millettia aurea
 Millettia australis - Samson's sinew (Norfolk Island)
 Millettia brandisiana
 Millettia bussei
 Millettia capuronii
 Millettia conraui
 Millettia decipiens
 Millettia diptera Gagnep.
 Millettia duchesnei
 Millettia elongistyla
 Millettia eriocarpa
 Millettia galliflagrans
 Millettia grandis – Umzimbeet
 Millettia hitsika
 Millettia lacus-alberti
 Millettia laurentii – Wengé
 Millettia leucantha
 Millettia macrophylla
 Millettia micans
 Millettia mossambicensis
 Millettia nathaliae
 Millettia nigrescens Gagnep.
 Millettia nitida
 Millettia orientalis
 Millettia pachycarpa
 Millettia peguensis
 Millettia pinnata
 Millettia psilopetela
 Millettia pterocarpa
 Millettia pubinervis Kurz
 Millettia puerarioides Prain
 Millettia richardiana
 Millettia rhodantha
 Millettia sacleuxii
 Millettia schliebenii
 Millettia semsei
 Millettia sericantha
 Millettia stuhlmannii – Panga panga
 Millettia sutherlandii
 Millettia taolanaroensis
 Millettia thonningii 
 Millettia unifoliata
 Millettia usaramensis – Lesser millettia
 Millettia utilis
 Millettia warneckei

References 

 PlantList search for millettia. Retrieved 20210327.

 
Fabaceae genera
Taxonomy articles created by Polbot